John Taolo Gaetsewe (formerly Kgalagadi) is one of the five districts of the Northern Cape province of South Africa. The seat of the authority is Kuruman. The majority of its 176,899 people speak Setswana (2001 Census). The district code is DC45.

Geography

Neighbours
John Taolo Gaetsewe is surrounded by:
 Dr Ruth Segomotsi Mompati (DC39) to the north-east
 Frances Baard (DC9) to the south
 ZF Mgcawu (DC8) to the south-west
 the Republic of Botswana in the north-west

Local municipalities
The district contains the following local municipalities:

Demographics
The following statistics are from the 2001 census.

Gender

Ethnic group

Age

Politics

Election results
Election results for the district (under its former name, Kgalagadi) in the South African general election, 2004. 
 Population 18 and over: 96 783 [54.71% of total population]
 Total votes: 65 198 [36.86% of total population]
 Voting % estimate: 67.37% votes as a % of population 18 and over

References

External links
 Official website

District municipalities of the Northern Cape
John Taolo Gaetsewe District Municipality